The AMC V8 may refer to either of two distinct OHV V8 engine designs that were developed and manufactured by American Motors Corporation (AMC). The engines were used in cars and trucks by AMC, Kaiser, and International Harvester as well as in marine and stationary applications. 

The first design was produced from 1956 through 1967. An Electrojector version was to be the first commercial electronic fuel injected (EFI) production engine for the 1957 model year.

The second design was introduced in 1966 and became available in several displacements over the years as well as in high-performance and racing versions. 

In 1987, Chrysler Corporation acquired AMC and continued manufacturing the AMC "tall-deck"  version  until 1991 for use in the Jeep Grand Wagoneer SUV.

American Motors Corporation 'Rambler V8' (1956–1967) 
This engine is most commonly referred to as the Rambler V8. It's also referred to as the AMC GEN1 (first generation AMC V-8) and sometimes as the Nash V8. 

American Motors' president, George W. Mason, had negotiated a verbal agreement with Packard that the two companies would supply parts for each other when practical. This was a prelude to a possible merger of the two companies at a later date, but that never occurred. With the industry-wide acceptance of V8 engine designs after World War II, AMC started buying Packard V8s in 1954 for the 1955 Nash Ambassador and Hudson Hornet. 

These Packard V8s were supplied with extra-thick head gaskets to reduce power output and came mated to Packard "Ultramatic" automatic transmissions only. In addition to the verbal agreement, Packard sent AMC some parts bids, but these were rejected as too expensive. George W. Romney, AMC's new leader, decided against further relationships with Packard shortly after entering the position of CEO in October 1954 after Mason's sudden death. It is said that Romney gave orders to design an in-house V8 engine as quickly as possible.

Directly quoting the original 1956 SAE Article entitled "The New American Motors V8": 
The entire program was under the direction of Meade F. Moore, Vice-President of Automotive Research and Engineering, and through his efforts, the project was carried on cooperatively by our Kenosha and Detroit Engineering Departments. Obviously, such a division of both design and development required the utmost in teamwork by F.F. Kishline, Chief Engineer, and his assistants, E.L. Monson and J.S. Voigt in Kenosha, and by R.H. Isbrandt, Chief Design Engineer, and W.S. Berry, Chief Mechanical Engineer, in Detroit." 

The engineering team was able to get the clean sheet V8 into production in less than 18 months due in part to being able to apply the research and development effots that were done by Kaiser-Frazer for engines that never reached production. One of AMC's engineers, David Potter, had worked on developing V8 engines for Kaiser-Frazer.

American Motor's first V8 engine debuted having  in 1956 with a   version in 1957. Production of the 250 was discontinued with a new  version replacing it in 1963. 

All these engines share common external dimensions, lightweight - about  - forged crankshaft and rods, as well as most other parts. Engine displacement was a factor of the bore: the  has a  bore, and the  a  bore. A number indicating the bore size is cast on the top of the engine block's flywheel housing immediately behind the right bank cylinder head. 

The block features a deep skirt where the casting extends below the crankshaft centerline, forming a very rigid crankcase gallery. The oil system feeds a central gallery to the cam and crankshaft first from front to rear and then dividing at the front to feed the two lifter galleries from front to rear. From the rear of the two lifter galleries oil is then supplied up to the two rocker arm shafts which serve as galleries to lubricate the valvetrain. The fore and aft direction changes are designed to eliminate stale oil areas which tend to form sludge deposits.

250 

American Motors' first V8 in-house engine, the 250, was used in AMC automobiles from 1956 through 1961. It was a modern OHV/pushrod engine design and made its debut in the Nash Ambassador and Hudson Hornet "Specials" of 1956. These cars had the top-of-the-line model trim, but were built on the shorter wheelbase (Statesman and Wasp) models (hence the "Special" name). The 250 uses solid lifters and came in two- and four-barrel carburetor varieties (4V only in Nash/Hudson "Specials").

The 250 V8 was optional in the 1957 Rambler. All 1958-60 V8 Ramblers were called "Rebels" and designated as a different series. It is easy to confuse the 1957 Rambler V8 and the 1958-'60 Rebel line with the special 1957 Rambler Rebel, a limited edition muscle car (see 327 below). In 1961, The Rambler Six was renamed the "Rambler Classic" to avoid model confusion in the Rambler line-up. A V8 engine then became an option in the Classic instead of a separate model.

287 

When the 250 was discontinued in 1961. A V8 engine was not offered in the Rambler models with the exception of the  327, which was only available in the top-of-the-line Ambassador. 

Dealers complained, so the  V8.  was introduced in mid-model year 1963 as an option for the "mid-size" Rambler. Like the 327, it uses hydraulic valve lifters. Only two-barrel models were produced, there were no four-barrel options from the factory for the 287 as this was the economy model V8. The 287 engine was produced through the 1966 model year.

327

Unlike the 250, most 327s were produced with hydraulic valve lifters. All Gray Marine 327s came with solid lifters, as did the 1957 Rebel. 

The AMC V8 is not related or manufactured by Chevrolet, whose 327 V8 was introduced five years later in 1962.

The AMC 327 engine debuted in a special edition 1957 Rambler Rebel, of which 1,500 were made. They were an early American muscle car. All Rebels had silver paint with a gold-anodized "spear" on each side. The 327 was not available in any other Rambler models in 1957. The Rebel's engine differs from the 327s installed in the 1957 Nash Ambassador and Hudson Hornet models in that it uses mechanical valve lifters and a higher compression ratio.

The Nash Ambassador and Hudson Hornet "Special" models were dropped after 1957, replaced by the 1958 Rambler Rebel with the 250 V8. The Rebel was a V8 version of the Rambler six and included the appropriate upgrades such as stronger front springs and rear axle. The Rebel model name also differentiated it from the standard six-cylinder Rambler. The big Nash and Hudson cars were also dropped after 1957, replaced by the 1958 "Ambassador by Rambler" — a stretched Rebel with the 327 V8 instead of the 250. The 327 was exclusive to the Ambassador line and could not be ordered in a Rebel (or later Classic) through 1964. For 1965 and 1966 the 287 and 327 were both available in the Classic and Ambassador.

The AMC 327 was sold to Kaiser-Jeep from 1965 until 1967 for use in the Jeep Wagoneer SUV and Gladiator pick-up truck. Jeep named it the "Vigilante" V8. Two-barrel carburation was standard on these Jeep models, but a four-barrel high-compression version was available in the highly optioned Super Wagoneer from 1966 until 1968. Kaiser-Jeep switched to the Buick 350 in 1967 after AMC discontinued the 327. The Buick V8 engine option continued through 1971 after which Jeeps returned to AMC V8 engines, American Motors having purchased Jeep from Kaiser in 1970.

There were low- and high-compression versions of the 327 starting in 1960. Prior to 1960, all 327s were high compression. All low-compression models used a two-barrel carburetor and all high-compression models received a four-barrel carb. The low compression of 8.7:1 and high of 9.7:1 was affected by a difference in pistons.

The AMC 327 was also offered as a marine engine as the "Fireball" by Gray Marine Motor Company.

Electronic fuel injection 
The AMC 327 was to be the first commercial electronic fuel injected (EFI) "Electrojector" production engine. Press reports about the Bendix-developed system in December 1956 were followed in March 1957 by an AMC price bulletin offering the EFI option on the Rambler Rebel for US$395, but due to supplier difficulties, fuel-injected Rebels were only available after 15 June. Teething problems with the Electrojector unit meant that only a few engineering and press cars were built, estimated to be no more than six units. At least two pre-production Rebels with EFI, however, are known to have been built. One was sent to Daytona Beach, Florida for "Speed Week" (the forerunner of today's Daytona 500). It was the second fastest car on the beach, bested only by a 1957 Chevrolet Corvette with mechanical fuel injection, and only by a couple of tenths of a second.

The EFI system in the Rebel was a far more-advanced setup than the mechanical types then appearing on the market and the engines ran fine in warm weather, but suffered hard starting in cooler temperatures. All the EFI cars were reportedly converted to four-barrel carbs before being sold; none are known to have existed outside the engineering department at AMC.

The main problem was that early electronics were not fast enough for "on the fly" engine controls. This setup was utilized by Chrysler for the 1958 model year on its Dodge, Chrysler, Plymouth, and DeSoto carlines. It too failed, having the same problems.

Bendix licensed patents based on their 1950s design (patent dated 1960) to Bosch, who perfected it as the basis for their D-Jetronic, et seq. injections system, first used in 1967.

Marine application 
The 250 and 327 were also offered as a marine engines marketed as "Fireball" by the Gray Marine Motor Company starting in 1958. Gray started offering the 250 in 1959. The 250 was offered in 135, 160, 170, 175, 178, and 185 horsepower versions. The 327 was made in 188, 215, 220, 225, and 238 horsepower levels. Gray used the 250 through 1966. The 327 was used as a 220 hp model in 1967, the last year an AMC V8 was used.

Gen-2 AMC short-deck V8 (1966–1970) 

The new-generation AMC V8 was introduced in 1966 It is sometimes referred to as the "Gen-2" AMC V8. The first version was the completely new  Typhoon V8 introduced in a special mid-1966 model year "Rogue" hardtop.

All three engines share the same basic block design and external measurements; the different displacements are achieved through various bore and stroke combinations. 

Bore center measurement was kept the same as the Gen-1 V8 at  so that boring equipment could be reused. Other than that, this engine is vastly different from the Gen-1 model. The Gen-1 engine is physically the size of a big-block Ford or GM engine, and is sometimes called a "big-block". The Gen-2 is closer to the physical size of U.S.-made small-block V8s except for the bore centers, which are the same as some big-block engines. The only parts shared between the 1966-67 Rambler V8 and 1966-91 AMV8 are the lower cam timing sprocket and the timing chain.

The AMC V8 was not built by Ford or anyone else although it bears an uncanny resemblance to the later Buick V8 engines (400, 430, 455). It shares the same design employing a timing gear case that mounts both the distributor and oil pump. It also shares the same oiling scheme employing a single passage to feed both cam and crank from the right lifter bank by tangentially intersecting the cam bore instead of two drilled passages, one from the cam to crank and another from the crank to the right lifter bank. Some electrical parts (starter and distributor) were shared with Ford, and some models used Motorcraft (Ford) carburetors, but the balance of the engine design is unique.

It was used exclusively in the Rambler American model in the first year. The  came out in 1967 and the AMX  arrived in mid-1968. These engine blocks were unchanged through the 1969 model year.

The head used during this time was the so-called "rectangle port", named after its exhaust port shape. The 290 heads use smaller valves,  intake and  exhaust, corresponding with its small bore. The 343 and the AMX 390 use the same larger valve heads,  intake and  exhaust.

290
The base  produced  with a two-barrel or four-barrel carburetor, respectively. It was built from the mid-1966 model year through the 1969 model year. Only 623 cars were built in 1966 with the 290 engine. These engines were available in special Rambler American two-door Rogue models. The newly powered Rogue was available with either a three-speed automatic or a floor-mounted four-speed manual transmission and made the car "suitable for the Stoplight Grand Prix."

343 
The basic 343/2V produced  and was built from 1967 through 1969. This version has a 10.2:1 compression ratio.

AMX 390 

It received heavier main bearing support webbing than the smaller AMC V8s, as well as a forged steel crankshaft and connecting rods. Forged cranks and rods were used for their known strength—there was inadequate time for testing cast parts for durability without delaying AMC's introduction schedule. Once forging dies were made it was not cost-effective to test cast parts due to the relatively low number of engines produced. The use of these stronger components was also continued with the production of 401 engines. This is an advantage of these AMC engines when used in heavy-duty and high-performance applications because they have no problems with their connecting rods breaking; unlike other domestic automakers' large displacement small block engines. The Gen-2 AMX 390 produced  and was built in 1968 and 1969.

Gen-3 AMC tall-deck (1970–1991) 

In 1970, all three blocks grew in deck height and gained a new head design. Although the engine is an outgrowth of the Gen-2 V8, these changes cause it to be regarded as the third generation of AMC V8, or "Gen-3". The 1970 AMX 390 remained at the same displacement by using a special connecting rod and piston for this year only. It is believed that AMC kept the 390 this last year due to the reputation it had garnered in the two-seater AMX, then still in production. (It was discontinued after 1970). In 1971 the 390 was also stroked by the same  as the other two versions of the engine to become the 401.

The other change in 1970 was the switch to the "dog-leg" heads. These heads flow 20% better on the exhaust side than the 1966-1969 rectangular port heads and are thus the best for performance. There are two reasons for the flow increase: (1) the area of the port is larger, due to the dog leg and (2) the shape of the port floor was changed from a concave to a convex curve. The concave floor tended to bend the exhaust flow upwards which caused turbulence when the flow was forced to go down into the exhaust manifolds. By switching to a convex floor the curvature of the flow starts in the head and proceeds much more smoothly into the exhaust manifold resulting in less turbulence and better flow.

The center two intake bolts on each head were relocated to prevent accidental mix-ups of Gen-2 and Gen-3 intakes.

AMC heads 319 and 291 used between 1970-mid 1971 have the dog-leg exhaust ports and 50-52 cc combustion chambers. They are commonly identified by the first three (319) or last three (291 for the 360-401 heads; 304 used a different casting) digits of the casting number. There was a U.S. auto industry-wide shift to lower compression ratios in mid-1971, so AMC increased combustion chamber size to 58-59 cc. The first three digits of the casting number on the large chamber heads are 321, 322, or 323 depending on year. The only difference between small and large chamber Gen-3 heads is the combustion chamber size.

The advertised power drop from the 1971 ratings to the ones for the 1972 model years (for example, the 1971 304 produced 210 hp and the 1972 304 was 150 hp) is not due to any engine changes, but an industry-wide shift from SAE Gross (also known as "brake horsepower" or "bhp") to SAE Net power ratings. The 1971 and 1972 engines produce the same power. The 1971 and earlier versions were rated using "gross" horsepower, which is with the engines operating with no accessories or drive belts, air filters, nor any exhaust system restrictions. The change to the more realistic "net" horsepower ratings for 1972 and later required the engine to be driving all stock factory accessories and to use the factory air filter system and a simulated factory exhaust. Power is measured at the flywheel for both systems. For example, even with the modifications to reduce emissions and increase efficiency, AMC's  engine was among the strongest factory-spec engines available in an American car in 1971, with more horsepower than Pontiac's standard  and Chevrolet's  that powered the Corvette.

304 

The International Harvester Corporation  SV "Comanche" V8 engines are sometimes mistaken for the AMC 304, however, the IHC V8 engine family has no relation to the AMC V8 and was in fact first produced in 1959, 11 years prior to the AMC designed 304. The similarity in displacement is purely a coincidence.

360 

This engine was used in the 1970 AMX as the base engine and also in the 1970 Rebel, the 1971 through 1978 Matador, Jeep J-series trucks from 1970 until 1987, Wagoneer (SJ) models from 1972 until 1984, Cherokee (SJ) from 1974 until 1983, as well as in the full-sized Grand Wagoneer from 1984 through 1991 - becoming one of the last carbureted engines used in an American-built vehicle. The 360 V8 was also installed in the Bricklin SV-1 sports car for the 1974 model year.

The 360 was the last AMC V8 to be manufactured. It continued to be produced after Chrysler bought American Motors in 1987 as the standard engine in the Jeep Grand Wagoneer through 1991, with the only modification being the "360" casting replaced with "5.9L" on the side of the block.

390 

401 

The  produced  gross in 1971 and  net from 1972 through 1975. Like the 390, the 401's crankshaft and connecting rods are forged steel. It was last produced in 1978.

The 401 was available in the Javelin, Matador, and Ambassador car lines and in Jeeps from its introduction in 1971 through 1974. In 1975 and 1976, emission controls, insurance rates, and high gasoline prices meant the 401 was available on the large Matador model, and then only for police department orders. Buyers of full-sized Jeeps (Wagoneer, Cherokee, J-10, and J-20) could order a 401 until 1978 (not available in 1979). This engine was also supplied to International Harvester for use as an optional engine in International's Light Line pickup trucks and Travelalls from late 1973 through 1974 where it was designated 'V-400' to differentiate it from IHC's own V/LV series 401.

"Service replacement" blocks 
There was also a "Service Replacement" block made as a modified GEN-3 design. This is a 401 casting (same casting number) without the displacement cast into the side and with a 360 bore and thicker deck. In theory, this single block could be built as any 343-401 GEN-2 or GEN-3 engine. A dealer could stock one or two blocks to use for warranty replacement.

The main bearing web area was thicker in the 390, 401, and SR blocks, thick enough that two additional bearing cap bolt holes could be drilled and tapped for an aftermarket four-bolt main cap, providing a stronger bottom end. AMC never built a factory four-bolt main block, they sold aftermarket four-bolt main caps through their Group 19 performance parts program.

The SR block was also sold as a heavy-duty racing block. It appeared in 1970 in time for the 1971 Trans-Am racing season and was used in the factory Trans-Am backed cars prepared by TRACO for Penske Racing, with Mark Donohue the primary driver. Since it was a standard factory part it did not have to be homologated under T/A rules, and was not used in the 2501 "Mark Donohue" Javelins built to homologate the "ducktail" spoiler. Those received standard 360 or 390 engines, buyers' choice.

Engine specs 

Note: Prior to 1972 figures are rated using SAE gross. Later engines use the current SAE net rating.

Indy 209
From 1976 until 1979, Jerry Grant "drove the most powerful car ever to appear in Indy car racing" - a turbocharged  two-valve, AMC Gen-2 block V8 engine producing  in his Eagle 74 chassis. The car was fast on the straightways, but the engine's weight made corners more difficult to handle. The engine utilized a  bore and a flat plane  stroke crankshaft.

See also 

 AMC Straight-4 engine
 AMC Straight-6 engine
 AMC/Jeep Transmissions
 List of Chrysler engines
 List of AMC Transmission Applications

References
Inline

General
 

V8
V8
V8
V8 engines